Jade Esmee Bowler, more commonly known by her YouTube handle, Unjaded Jade, is a YouTuber and author. She is often referred to as one of the first "StudyTubers".

Early life and education 
Bowler is from Berkshire. She is the daughter of Simon Bowler and Annet Venema. She is half Dutch. Her mother is a yoga instructor. Though she originally planned to study biology at Bristol University, Bowler attends Minerva University. She began studying there in 2019 after travelling and taking a gap year.

Career 
Bowler started her channel in February 2017. On her channel, Bowler's content focusses on school and studying and she is often referred to as an originator of what is known as "StudyTube". She is signed by the talent agency, Sixteenth. With fellow StudyTubers, Ruby Granger, Eve Cornwell, and Jack Edwards, Bowler co-created the podcast, The Wooden Spoon. 

In 2021, she published her book, The Only Study Guide You’ll Ever Need with Blink Publishing.

References 

Date of birth missing (living people)
English YouTubers
Educational and science YouTubers
YouTube vloggers
Writers from Berkshire
People from Maidenhead
2000 births
Living people
English video bloggers